Saffold may refer to:

 Saffold virus, single-stranded RNA human virus
 Saffold Dam, dam in Seguin, Texas
 Belvoir (Saffold Plantation),  historic plantation in Pleasant Hill, Alabama, United States
 Saffold (surname)